Boletus subcaerulescens is a basidiomycete fungus of the genus Boletus found in northeastern North America. The fruiting bodies are found associated with pine and spruce.  The cap is up to 18 cm wide, convex to flat, and brown in color.  The tubes are yellow and stain blue (later becoming brown) when bruised, while the flesh is white to buff and does not stain when cut.  The stem is brown like the cap and has a light-colored reticulate texture.

The specific epithet is from Latin: sub- + caeruleus + -escens, literally "becoming dark blue beneath".

Phylogenetic analysis has shown B. subcaerulescens as a member of a clade, or closely related group, with B. pinophilus, B. regineus, B. rex-veris, B. fibrillosus, and Gastroboletus subalpinus.

See also
List of Boletus species
List of North American boletes

References

External links

subcaerulescens
Fungi of North America
Fungi described in 1965